In geometry, a deltoidal hexecontahedron (also sometimes called a trapezoidal hexecontahedron, a strombic hexecontahedron, or a tetragonal hexacontahedron) is a Catalan solid which is the dual polyhedron of the rhombicosidodecahedron, an Archimedean solid. It is one of six Catalan solids to not have a Hamiltonian path among its vertices.

It is topologically identical to the nonconvex rhombic hexecontahedron.

Lengths and angles
The 60 faces are deltoids or kites. The short and long edges of each kite are in the ratio 1: ≈ 1:1.539344663...

The angle between two short edges in a single face is arccos()≈118.2686774705°. The opposite angle, between long edges, is arccos()≈67.783011547435° . The other two angles of each face, between a short and a long edge each, are both equal to arccos()≈86.97415549104°.

The dihedral angle between any pair of adjacent faces is arccos()≈154.12136312578°.

Topology
Topologically, the deltoidal hexecontahedron is identical to the nonconvex rhombic hexecontahedron. The deltoidal hexecontahedron can be derived from a dodecahedron (or icosahedron) by pushing the face centers, edge centers and vertices out to different radii from the body center. The radii are chosen so that the resulting shape has planar kite faces each such that vertices go to degree-3 corners, faces to degree-five corners, and edge centers to degree-four points.

Cartesian coordinates
The 62 vertices of the disdyakis triacontahedron fall in three sets centered on the origin:

 Twelve vertices are of the form of a unit circumradius regular icosahedron.
 Twenty vertices are of the form of a  scaled regular dodecahedron.
 Thirty vertices are of the form of a  scaled Icosidodecahedron.

These hulls are visualized in the figure below:

Orthogonal projections
The deltoidal hexecontahedron has 3 symmetry positions located on the 3 types of vertices:

Variations

The deltoidal hexecontahedron can be constructed from either the regular icosahedron or regular dodecahedron by adding vertices mid-edge, and mid-face, and creating new edges from each edge center to the face centers. Conway polyhedron notation would give these as oI, and oD, ortho-icosahedron, and ortho-dodecahedron. These geometric variations exist as a continuum along one degree of freedom.

Related polyhedra and tilings 

When projected onto a sphere (see right), it can be seen that the edges make up the edges of an icosahedron and dodecahedron arranged in their dual positions.

This tiling is topologically related as a part of sequence of deltoidal polyhedra with face figure (V3.4.n.4), and continues as tilings of the hyperbolic plane. These face-transitive figures have (*n32) reflectional symmetry.

See also
Deltoidal icositetrahedron

References 

  (Section 3-9)
 The Symmetries of Things 2008, John H. Conway, Heidi Burgiel, Chaim Goodman-Strass,   (Chapter 21, Naming the Archimedean and Catalan polyhedra and tilings, page 286, tetragonal hexecontahedron)
 http://mathworld.wolfram.com/ArchimedeanDualGraph.html

External links
 
 Deltoidal Hexecontahedron (Trapezoidal Hexecontrahedron)—Interactive Polyhedron Model
 Example in real life—A ball almost 4 meters in diameter, from ripstop nylon, and inflated by the wind. It bounces around on the ground so that kids can play with it at kite festivals.

Catalan solids